= Heatherman, West Virginia =

- Unincorporated community
- Location within West Virginia and the United States Heatherman (the United States)
- Coordinates: 38°28′36″N 81°18′41″W
- Country: United States
- State: West Virginia
- County: Kanawha
- Elevation: 630 ft (190 m)
- Time zone: UTC-5 (Eastern (EST))
  - Summer (DST): UTC-4 (EDT)
- GNIS ID: 1742085

Heatherman was an unincorporated community in Kanawha County, West Virginia, United States. Its post office has been closed.
